Matt Sorum is an American rock drummer who has released two solo studio albums and a further 14 studio albums with various groups.
He mainly plays drums.

Solo

Albums

Other appearances

with Y Kant Tori Read

with Guns N' Roses

Other appearance

with Slash's Snakepit

with the Power Rangers Orchestra

with Neurotic Outsiders

with Hawk

with The Cult

with Velvet Revolver

with Camp Freddy

with Johnny Crash

with Kings of Chaos

with Deadland Ritual

Guest appearances

References

Discography
Discographies of American artists
Rock music discographies